The Bangladesh Administrative Service (BAS) is the premier civil service cadre of the Bangladesh Civil Service, and which formulates and executes the policies of the government of the People's Republic of Bangladesh of which it is an inseparable part.

BAS officers hold all senior and middle-ranking administrative posts, such as the permanent heads (non-political) of government ministries, as well as divisions and departments within ministries, in the central secretariat headquartered in Dhaka.

Additionally, in the field administration (outside central government ministries), the senior administrative posts in the eight Divisions and their sub-units are also held by officers of the BAS.

The Cabinet Secretary of Bangladesh is the senior post in the BAS (as well as the Bangladesh Civil Service), as the chief civil servant in the Cabinet Division, and is by virtue regarded as the most senior civil servant in Bangladesh.

History
 British Era (pre-1947, see Indian Civil Service)
 Pakistan Era (1947-1971, see Central Superior Services of Pakistan)
 Bangladesh Era (1971-present, see Bangladesh Civil Service)

Organogram

Central Administration
These are based primarily in the Bangladesh Secretariat, Dhaka
 Cabinet Secretary of Bangladesh (Head of the Cabinet Division, and Head of the Bangladesh Civil Service)
 Principal Secretary (this grade is for the Head of the Prime Minister's Office, and equivalent in stature to the Cabinet Secretary)
 Senior Secretary (Reserved for the secretaries in the most important ministries and departments, as well as for long and distinguished service to the government)
 Secretary (usually the head of a ministry, or in some cases Divisions within important ministries)
 Additional Secretary 
 Joint Secretary
 Deputy Secretary
 Senior Assistant Secretary
 Assistant Secretary

Field Administration
Commissioner (Division)
Additional Commissioner
Deputy Commissioner (District)
Additional Deputy Commissioner
Upazila Nirbahi Officer (Sub-District)
Assistant Commissioner

Recruitment
All BAS officers are recruited at a single entry-level by the Bangladesh Public Service Commission, having undertaken and scored highest in what is widely regarded as the most competitive examination in Bangladesh, the Bangladesh Civil Service examination. These candidates are then commissioned into the Bangladesh Civil Service (Administration) cadre.

The first post of all new officers is as Assistant Commissioner in the field administration on a 2-year probation after which they are confirmed on passing assessments. The most promising officers are transferred to the central administration as Senior Assistant Secretary after 5-years in the field administration, during which they will rotate between the centre and field on their career progression.

Functions

Central Administration
In a ministry or division BAS officers are responsible for policy formulation and implementation to Ministers. They mainly perform four types of functions: secretarial, administrative (policy), communications and financial; as either policy advisers or in management roles.

Field Administration
In field administration, BAS officers play two different roles from the start of their career: as a "commissioner" delivering government policy in their geographic unit, and as Executive Magistrate. They execute the powers of executive magistracy to the extent specified by government directives and Acts of Parliament.

Section 10 of the Code of Criminal Procedure specifies that a Deputy Commissioner, Additional Deputy Commissioner, Senior Assistant Commissioner (also UNO) and Assistant Commissioner (also of Land) are all Executive Magistrates in field administration.

Additionally, as per sub section 10(5), if required, the government can empower any member of Bangladesh Administrative Service as an Executive Magistrate by means of deputation e.g. Executive Magistrate in organisations like Bangladesh Road and Transport Authority (BRTA), City Corporations, Ports, Airports etc.

Bangladesh Civil Service Administration Academy

The academy provides a five-month long basic training course related to law and administration for newly appointed officers of Bangladesh Civil Service (Administration) cadre, and various periodical training for officers of different levels. In addition, a one-year "Master in Public Policy and Management (MPPM)" course is delivered by the academy to mid-ranking BAS officers.

The academy is headed by the Rector, who is of the rank of Secretary to the Government.

Administrative Service Association
The Bangladesh Administrative Service Association (BASA) is a professional platform and club for all the members of the BAS, including retired officers. The association's headquarters is located in Eskaton, Dhaka.

BASA arranges an annual get-together its for members, with the Prime Minister and Cabinet Secretary appearing regularly as the chief guests.

References

Civil service in Bangladesh